Stavenhagen is a municipality in Mecklenburgische Seenplatte district, Mecklenburg-Vorpommern, Germany.

Stavenhagen may also refer to:
 Stavenhagen (Amt), an amt in Mecklenburgische Seenplatte district, Mecklenburg-Vorpommern, Germany

People with the surname
 Agnes Stavenhagen (1860–1945), German soprano, wife of Bernhard
 Bernhard Stavenhagen (1862–1914), German pianist, composer and conductor
 Rodolfo Stavenhagen (1932–2016), Mexican sociologist

See also
Stavenhagenhaus or Frustberg House, a cultural heritage site in Groß Borstel, Hamburg, Germany